WR Hambrecht + Co. is a full-service investment bank with headquarters in San Francisco and offices in New York, Boston, Philadelphia, and Tokyo. It was founded in 1998 by Bill Hambrecht. It specializes in using its unique auction process called OpenIPO to compete with the traditional methods of larger and more established banks. Recently, it has underwritten companies such as Google, Morningstar and Interactive Brokers. The firm has financial backing from industry leaders including American Century, Crimson Ventures, epartners, Fidelity Ventures, Novell, and Park Avenue Equity Capital Partners.

Sources
Open and Fair: Why Wall St. Hates Auctions

References

External links
 

Investment banks in the United States
American companies established in 1998
Banks established in 1998
Financial services companies established in 1998
Companies based in San Francisco